Levi Withee "L. W." Gibson (May 31, 1872 – May 1, 1919) was an American businessman and politician.

Born in La Crosse, Wisconsin, Gibson was educated in the public schools, went to Lawrence University, and then lived in Medford, Wisconsin. He was president of Jos. Gibson Company which dealt with lumber and logging. Gibson was also president of the First National Bank of Medford. In 1919, Gibson served in the Wisconsin State Assembly and was a Republican. In May 1919, Gibson died suddenly of a heart attack, at age 46, while reading a newspaper in his room in Madison, Wisconsin.

Notes

1872 births
1919 deaths
Politicians from La Crosse, Wisconsin
People from Medford, Wisconsin
Lawrence University alumni
Businesspeople from Wisconsin
19th-century American politicians
19th-century American businesspeople
Republican Party members of the Wisconsin State Assembly